In Greek mythology, Cometes (Ancient Greek: Κομήτης) may refer to the following figures:

 Cometes, son of Thestius and brother of Prothous and Althaea.
Cometes, the Peirasian father of Asterius, one of the Argonauts. His wife could be Antigona, daughter of Pheres, who was called mother of the said hero.
 Cometes, one of the Lapiths attending Pirithous' wedding. He was killed by Charaxus, his friend, accidentally.
 Cometes, was the lover of Aegialia, wife of Diomedes, when the latter was fighting at Troy. Cometes was son of Sthenelus, son of Capaneus, son of Hipponous.
 Cometes, was the first among the sons of Tisamenus to sail to Asia. It was under the reign of Tisamenus, son of Orestes, that the Heracleidae returned to the Peloponnesus.

Notes

References 

 Apollonius Rhodius, Argonautica translated by Robert Cooper Seaton (1853-1915), R. C. Loeb Classical Library Volume 001. London, William Heinemann Ltd, 1912. Online version at the Topos Text Project.
 Apollonius Rhodius, Argonautica. George W. Mooney. London. Longmans, Green. 1912. Greek text available at the Perseus Digital Library.
 Gaius Julius Hyginus, Fabulae from The Myths of Hyginus translated and edited by Mary Grant. University of Kansas Publications in Humanistic Studies. Online version at the Topos Text Project.
 Pausanias, Description of Greece with an English Translation by W.H.S. Jones, Litt.D., and H.A. Ormerod, M.A., in 4 Volumes. Cambridge, MA, Harvard University Press; London, William Heinemann Ltd. 1918. . Online version at the Perseus Digital Library
 Pausanias, Graeciae Descriptio. 3 vols. Leipzig, Teubner. 1903.  Greek text available at the Perseus Digital Library.
 Pseudo-Apollodorus, The Library with an English Translation by Sir James George Frazer, F.B.A., F.R.S. in 2 Volumes, Cambridge, MA, Harvard University Press; London, William Heinemann Ltd. 1921. . Online version at the Perseus Digital Library. Greek text available from the same website.
 Publius Ovidius Naso, Metamorphoses translated by Brookes More (1859-1942). Boston, Cornhill Publishing Co. 1922. Online version at the Perseus Digital Library.
 Publius Ovidius Naso, Metamorphoses. Hugo Magnus. Gotha (Germany). Friedr. Andr. Perthes. 1892. Latin text available at the Perseus Digital Library.

Thessalian characters in Greek mythology